Ashford Steam Centre was a short-lived railway museum at Willesborough, Ashford, Kent, United Kingdom. It was located at the former engine shed that was situated east of Ashford railway station. The museum opened in 1968 and closed in 1976.

History
Ashford Steam Centre was established by Esmond Lewis-Evans. It occupied the former engine shed that was located east of Ashford railway station. The shed, with its turntable, coaling stage and water tower had been built by the Southern Railway in 1931. It ceased to be used for the servicing of steam locomotives in June 1962, following which it was used to service diesel locomotives. The steam centre was established in 1968. On 11 April 1971, the Southern Electric Group organised the Man of Kent 71 railtour, which visited the steam centre. Class 71 locomotive E5005 and 4TC set 427 were used.

In 1974, the centre was open once a month, on the second Sunday of the month. At the time, there were around a dozen locomotives on site. Due to mounting debts, the steam centre was closed May 1976 and its rolling stock was dispersed. The engine shed and surrounding area were cleared in 1989, with the area being used for the storage of motor vehicles. Since 2005 most of the site has been sold for housing development.

Rolling stock
The following items of rolling stock were based at Ashford Steam Centre.

Locomotives

Multiple units

Carriages
{| class="wikitable"
|-
! Origin
! Number
! Type
! Notes
! Photograph
|-
| SECR
| 950
| Birdcage brake
| Built for the South Eastern & Chatham Railway's boat trains, with the introduction of the new corridor boat train in the early years of the Southern Railway, it was then kept as a spare, downgraded to third class. It subsequently found use in one of the Eastern Section's 'long' sets until converted into a mess van on withdrawal. Moved to a farm near Ashford in 1983, then to the Bluebell Railway in September 1998. It is stored unserviceable on the Bluebell Railway.
| 
|-
| Pullman
| No 243 Lucille
| Parlour First
| Built in 1928 by Metro Cammell for the LNER Queen of the Scots service. Transferred in 1963 to the Southern Region of British Railways for use on the Bournemouth Belle. Withdrawn in 1967 and arrived at Ashford the following year. Following closure, Lucille remained on site until she was sold in May 1985 for use on the  Venice-Simplon Orient Express.
| 
|-
| Pullman
| No 306 Orion
| 
| Built in 1951 for use on the Golden Arrow. Withdrawn on 1 October 1972 and arrived at Ashford later that month. Moved to Peco Modelrama, Beer, Devon post-closure.
| 
|-
| Pullman
| No 238 Phyllis
| Parlour First
| Built for the LNER in 1928. Arrived at Ashford in 1968. Moved to Molash, Kent in 1983 and subsequently to Shottenden. Stored at the Bluebell Railway in 1997. Sold to the Venice-Simplon Orient Express in 2000.
| 
|-
| Pullman
| No 43 Sapphire
| 
| Built for the SECR in 1910, rebuilt in 1937. To Lavender Line in 1984. Sold in 1988 to a private owner and used in a restaurant at Seaburn, Tyne and Wear.
| 
|-
| NSB
| 1001
| Four-wheel brake
| Moved to the Great Central Railway post-closure. Later moved to Bressingham, Norfolk.
| 
|}

Other items of rolling stock
{| class="wikitable"
|-
! Origin
! Number
! Type
! Notes
! Photograph
|-
| Grafton
| 
| Self-propelled crane.
| 
| 
|-
| 
| 
| Six-wheeled van
| 
| 
|-
| Smith's, Rodley
| 
| Steam crane.
| 
| 
|}

References

Ashford, Kent
Museums in the Borough of Ashford
Heritage railways in Kent
1968 establishments in England
1976 disestablishments in England
Defunct museums in England